Biemesderfer Stadium is the American football stadium at Millersville University of Pennsylvania, and is located in Millersville, Pennsylvania.  Originally known as Biemesderfer Field, it has been the Marauders' football home facility since 1958.  The stadium was constructed for a price of $450,000 and opened in 1970.  Biemesderfer Stadium was named for Daniel Luke Biemesderfer, who was Millersville University's ninth president from 1943 to 1965.

In 1985, a lighting system was added to Biemesderfer Stadium to allow night games to be played at the stadium.

References

External links 
Biemesderfer Stadium

Sports venues in Pennsylvania
Sports in Lancaster, Pennsylvania
College football venues
Buildings and structures in Lancaster County, Pennsylvania
Millersville Marauders football
1970 establishments in Pennsylvania
American football venues in Pennsylvania
Sports venues completed in 1970